Majhgaon  Assembly constituency   is an assembly constituency in  the Indian state of Jharkhand.

Members of Assembly 
2005: Niral Purty, Jharkhand Mukti Morcha
2009: Barkuwar Gagrai, Bharatiya Janata Party
2014: Niral Purty, Jharkhand Mukti Morcha

Election Results

2019

See also
Vidhan Sabha
List of states of India by type of legislature

References

Assembly constituencies of Jharkhand